Barcelona power station (also Power station of Barcelona) is a combined cycle thermoelectric plant located at Pier Energy of Port of Barcelona, in Barcelona, Spain. It has 2 thermal units of 425 MW, which use natural gas as fuel, and with a total electric power of 850 MW. It is owned by the multinational company Gas Natural.

See also 
 List of power stations in Spain
 Besós power station
 Besós V power station

References 

Buildings and structures in Barcelona
Power stations in Catalonia
Natural gas-fired power stations in Spain
Energy infrastructure completed in 2008